Breštani is a village in the municipality of Centar Župa, North Macedonia.

Demographics
The village is inhabited by a Turkish speaking population consisting of Turks.

As of the 2021 census, Breštani had 104 residents with the following ethnic composition:
Turks 101
Persons for whom data are taken from administrative sources 3

According to the 2002 census, the village had a total of 120 inhabitants. Ethnic groups in the village include:
Turks 120

References

Villages in Centar Župa Municipality
Turkish communities in North Macedonia